The 2012 NCAA Rifle Championships were contested at the 33rd annual NCAA-sanctioned competition to determine the team and individual national champions of co-ed collegiate rifle shooting in the United States. 

The championship was hosted by Ohio State University at the Lt. Hugh W. Wylie Range in Columbus, Ohio.

TCU won the team championship, the Horned Frogs' second NCAA national title in rifle.

Qualification
With only one national collegiate championship for rifle shooting, all NCAA rifle programs (whether from Division I, Division II, or Division III) were eligible. A total of eight teams contested this championship.

Results
Scoring:  The championship consisted of 60 shots for both smallbore and air rifle per team.

Team title
(DC) = Defending champions
Italics = Inaugural championship
† = Team won center shot tiebreaker

Individual events

References

NCAA Rifle Championship
NCAA Rifle Championships
2012 in shooting sports
NCAA Rifle Championships